Northway  may refer to:

Places
Canada
 Camp Northway, the oldest summer camp for girls in Canada

United Kingdom
 Northway, Devon, England
 Northway, Gloucestershire, England
 Northway, Oxford, England
 Northway, Somerset, England
 Northway, Swansea, Wales

United States
 Northway, Alaska, a village
 Northway Junction, Alaska, a village
 Northway Village, Alaska, a village
 Northway Mall, a shopping mall in Anchorage, Alaska
 Northway Shopping Center, a shopping mall in Colonie, New York
 The Shoppes at Northway, a shopping mall in Ross Township, Pennsylvania
 Adirondack Northway, the segment of Interstate 87 between Albany, New York, and the Canada–US border

People
Notable people with the Northway surname include:
 Doug Northway (born 1955), American swimmer
 Edward Northway (1901–1966), English cricketer
 Mary Louise Northway (1909–1987), Canadian psychologist
 Reginald Northway (1906–1936), Sri Lanka-born cricketer in England
 Stephen A. Northway (1833–1898), American lawyer and politician

Other
 Northway Bank, a community bank in New Hampshire
 Northway Books, a British publisher specialising in books about jazz